Richard Graham (born 1934, in Goiás, Brazil) is a Brazilian/American historian specializing in nineteenth-century Brazil. He was formerly Professor of History, University of Texas at Austin, and is now professor emeritus there. He served as president of the Conference on Latin American History, the professional organization of Latin American historians.

Works
Feeding the City: From Street Market to Liberal Reform in Salvador, Brazil, 1780-1860, University of Texas Press, 2010
Patronage and Politics in Nineteenth-Century Brazil, Stanford University Press, 1990
Britain and the Onset of Modernization in Brazil Cambridge University Press, 1968
The Idea of Race in Latin America edited, University of Texas Press, 1990
Juggling Race and Class in Brazil's Past PMLA 123:5 (Oct. 2008)
Another Middle Passage? The Internal Slave Trade in Brazil, in Walter Johnson, Chattel Principle Yale University Press 2004
Slavery and Economic Development:  Brazil and the U.S. South Comparative Studies in Society and History, 23:4 (Oct 1981)
Constructing a Nation in Nineteenth-Century Brazil: Old and New Views on Class, Culture, and the State, Journal of the Historical Society, Boston University, Volume 1, Number 2-3, spring 2001 
Independence in Latin America: A Comparative Approach Knopf, 1972, McGraw-Hill, 1994

References

External links
Richard Graham (University of Texas)

1934 births
Living people
21st-century American historians
American male non-fiction writers
Latin Americanists
20th-century Brazilian historians
University of Texas at Austin faculty
Brazilianists
College of Wooster alumni
21st-century American male writers